Nippletop is a mountain located in Essex County, New York. 
The mountain is part of the Colvin Range.
Nippletop is flanked to the northeast by Dial Mountain.
To the east, it faces Dix Mountain across Hunters Pass, and to the west it faces Mount Colvin across Elk Pass.

The west side of Nippletop drains into the West Inlet of Elk Lake, thence into The Branch of the Schroon River, the Hudson River, and into New York Bay.
The south and east sides of Nippletop drain into the East Inlet of Elk Lake.
The northeast side of Nippletop drains into the headwaters of the North Fork of the Boquet River, thence into Lake Champlain, which drains into Canada's Richelieu River, the Saint Lawrence River, and into the Gulf of Saint Lawrence.
The northwest side of Nippletop drains into Gill Brook, thence into the East Branch of Ausable River, and into Lake Champlain.

See also 
 List of mountains in New York
 Northeast 111 4,000-footers
 Adirondack High Peaks
 Adirondack Forty-Sixers
 Breast-shaped hill

Notes

External links 
  Peakbagger.com: Nippletop
  Summitpost.org: Nippletop
 

Mountains of Essex County, New York
Adirondack High Peaks
Mountains of New York (state)